A Snowflake Fell (and It Felt Like a Kiss) is a Christmas-themed EP by the Scottish indie rock band Glasvegas, released on 1 December 2008 via Columbia Records.

Recording, mixing & mastering
The album was recorded in the United States and Romania over twelve days in October 2008. The band spent one week recording with Rich Costey, who they had previously worked with earlier in the year on their eponymous debut studio album, Glasvegas. The band then flew to Transylvania where they spent a further week recording in a Citadel which they converted into a small recording studio. The Concentus Choir, featured on the track "Silent Night/Noapte de Vis," was recorded at St. Nicholas Church in Braşov.

Release and reception
A Snowflake Fell (and It Felt Like a Kiss) was released as a limited edition standalone CD and as part of a special edition double CD with the band's debut album Glasvegas, featured in a small box with fold-out poster, and separately as a digital download. The album has reached number 59 on the Swedish Albums Chart. The song "A Snowflake Fell (and It Felt Like a Kiss)" has reached number 17 on the Swedish Singles Chart and number 95 on the UK Singles Chart. "Please Come Back Home" has also reached number 76 on the UK Singles Chart.

Track listing

References

2008 albums
Glasvegas albums
Christmas EPs